Sira (also Romanized as Sīrā and Sirah; also known as Sarāb) was a village in Adaran Rural District, Asara District, Karaj County, Alborz Province, Iran. At the 2006 census, its population was 296, in 78 families.  It has since been incorporated into the city of Asara.

References 

Former populated places in Karaj County